A bomb factory is a factory for building munitions.

Bomb Factory may also refer to:

 Bomb Factory Studio, Los Angeles, California, US; a recording studio
 The Factory in Deep Ellum (aka "The Bomb Factory"), Dallas, Texas, US; a live music venue
 The Bomb Factory Art Foundation, London, England, UK; an arts foundation
 Bomb Factory (band), a Japanese punk rock band
 Bomb Factory (album), a 1999 album by the eponymous Japanese band

See also
 Arsenals, including factories of bombs
 Strategic bombing of factories
 Factory (disambiguation)
 Bomb (disambiguation)